Humphrey Coningsby (born ca. 1623) was an English politician who sat in the House of Commons from 1641 to 1644. He supported the  Royalist side in the English Civil War.

Coningsby was the eldest son of Fitzwilliam Conningsby, of Hampton Court, Herefordshire,  and Cicely Nevill,  daughter of Henry Nevill,  9th Baron Bergavenny. He matriculated at Lincoln College, Oxford on 23 February 1638, aged 15. He was of the Middle Temple in 1639.

In November 1641, Coningsby was elected Member of Parliament for Herefordshire in the Long Parliament, replacing his father who had been expelled as a monopolist. He supported the King and was disabled from sitting in parliament on 22 January 1644.

Coningsby married Lettice Loftus, eldest daughter of Sir Arthur Loftus of Rathfarnham, Ireland. Their son Thomas became Earl Coningsby.

References

1623 births
Year of death missing
English MPs 1640–1648
Cavaliers
Alumni of Lincoln College, Oxford